Field hockey in the Netherlands is a sport which has popular support in the country. There are 350,000 people who play for a variety of field hockey teams.

History

In 1892 was the when field hockey was first played in the Netherlands. The Royal Dutch Hockey Federation the governing body for field hockey in the country.

Domestic League

Hoofdklasse Hockey has a men's and women's professional field hockey leagues. The hockey season begins in two stages: from September to December and then March to June.

National teams
The men's and women's national teams have enjoyed major success in international field hockey tournaments. The Dutch women's national team has won gold at the Olympics (1984, 2008, 2012). The women's team has won 8 world championships.

World Rankings

References